Alexander or Aleksandr Kuznetsov is the name of:

Footballers
 Aleksandr Kuznetsov (footballer, born 1997), Russian footballer
 Aleksandr Dmitriyevich Kuznetsov (born 1951), Soviet Russian football player and coach

Other sportspeople
 Aleksandr Kuznetsov (skier), Russian skier, participated in Cross-country skiing at the 2007 Winter Universiade
 Aleksandr Anatolyevich Kuznetsov (born 1941), Russian cycling coach for Viatcheslav Ekimov, father of Svetlana Kuznetsova
 Alex Kuznetsov (born 1987), American tennis player of Ukrainian origin
 Alexander Kuznetsov (ice hockey) (born 1992), Russian ice hockey player

Others
 Aleksandr Kuznetsov (explorer), Russian explorer of the North Pole
 Aleksandr Kuznetsov (tea trader) (1856–1895) Russian tea magnate, landowner of Foros, Crimea, and financier of Foros Church
 Aleksandr Vasilyevich Kuznetsov (Hero of the Russian Federation), Hero of the Russian Federation
 Alexander Kuznetsov (actor) (1959-2019), Russian-American actor
 Alexander Kuznetsov (mathematician) (born 1973), Russian mathematician
 Aleksandr Kuznetsov (actor) (born 1992), Russian actor